The 1993 Battle of Mogadishu, more commonly known as Black Hawk Down, was detailed by the U.S. Army and lasted from October 3 to October 4 in 1993.

October 3, 1993

Afternoon 
13:50 – Task Force Ranger analysts receive intelligence of Salad's location.

14:49 – Habr Gidr clan leaders, two principal targets, and the United Nations Corporation are located at a residence in central Mogadishu, Somalia.

15:32 – Official force launch, consisting of 19 aircraft , twelve vehicles, and 160 men.

15:42 – Official assault begins. 1st SFOD-D soldiers hit the target house. Four-Ranger "chalk" "fast-rope" in. A Ranger, Private First Class Todd Blackburn, misses the rope and falls 70 feet to the street.

15:47 – Large crowds of Somalis begin converging on the target area.

15:58 – One of the vehicles, a five-ton truck, is hit and disabled by a rocket propelled grenade.

16:00 – Groups of armed Somalis from the city of Mogadishu begin converging on the target area.

16:02 – Raid targets captured: Assault force reports both clan leaders and about 21 others were in custody. As the force prepares to pull out, three vehicles are detached to rush the wounded Private Blackburn back to the base. SGT Dominick Pilla is killed as these vehicles return to base, becoming the first American fatality.

16:15 – The convoy is delayed and does not move out due to confusion about who is signaling whom. It turned out that Delta was waiting for the convoy to originate the signal to them while the convoy was waiting for Delta to initiate the signal to them. The prisoners were eventually loaded after the Delta teams moved the prisoners to the trucks.

16:20 – First helicopter crash: Black Hawk Super 6-1 is hit by a rocket-propelled grenade and crashed five blocks northeast of the target building. Delta Force snipers SSG Daniel Busch and SGT Jim Smith, survive the crash and begin to defend the crash site.

16:22 – Crowds of armed Somalis start racing towards the Super 6-1 crash site.

16:26 – A Humvee convoy starts moving. When the prisoners are loaded up, the convoy and ground forces all begin moving towards the crashed helicopter. Black Hawk Super 6-4, piloted by Chief Warrant Officer Michael Durant, takes the place of Black Hawk Super 6-1 circling over the city.

16:28 – Search and rescue of Black Hawk Super 6-1: search and rescue team ropes in to assist the crew of the first crashed helicopter. Both pilot and co-pilot were dead. Two of the crew chiefs, Staff Sgt. Ray Dowdy and Staff Sgt. Charlie Warren, were severely wounded.

16:35 – The Convoy made a wrong turn and got lost among the city streets, sustaining heavy casualties by Somali snipers and armed militia.

16:40 – Second helicopter crash: Mike Durant's Black Hawk, Super 6-4, is also hit by a Somali rocket propelled grenade, and crashed about a mile southwest of the target building. Hostile crowds of Somalians begin moving toward it as well.

16:42 – Two Delta Force snipers, Sergeant First Class Randy Shughart and Master Sergeant Gary Gordon, who had been providing cover fire by air were inserted into the crash site by helicopter at their own request, to help protect the injured Durant and his crew.

16:54 – HMMWV convoy abandons Black Hawk Super 6-1 search. The Lost Convoy, with more than half of its force either wounded or dead, abandons its search for the first downed Black Hawk and begins fighting its way back to the base.

17:03 – Quick Reaction Force convoy (a smaller, emergency convoy) is dispatched from Command and Control in an attempt to rescue the men stranded at Durant's crash site. It encounters immediate obstacles.

17:34 – QRF and the Lost Convoy decided to return to base. Both convoys, having sustained heavy casualties, linked up and abandon the efforts to break through to Durant. The remainder of the ground force of Rangers and commandos were converging around the first crash site, sustaining many casualties. Ranger Corporal Jamie Smith is among those shot.

17:40 – Snipers Shughart and Gordon run out of ammunition and are killed when hostile Somalis overrun Durant's crash site. Every member of the crew are dead, except for Durant, who suffered a broken leg and injured back. Durant is carried off by militia (He was eventually released to the Red Cross, 11 days later.) During Operation Gothic Serpent in Somalia, Durant was the pilot of helicopter "Super Six Four." It was the second MH-60L of two Black Hawk helicopters to crash during the Battle of Mogadishu on October 3, 1993. His helicopter was hit on the tail by a rocket-propelled grenade. That led to its crash about a mile southwest of the operation's target. (Both Gordon and Shughart received the Medal of Honor posthumously for their heroism in this action.)

17:45 – Both convoys return to the base. Ninety-nine men remain trapped and surrounded in the city around the first downed Black Hawk. Corporal Smith is bleeding heavily, medic requests immediate evacuation.

19:08 – Black Hawk Super 6-6 makes a daring re-supply run, dropping water, ammunition and medical supplies to the trapped force. It is badly damaged, cannot land to evacuate Corporal Smith, and limps back to base.

20:27 – Ranger Corporal Jamie Smith dies.

21:00 – Joint Task Force Command requests assistance from other commands. The Rescue Convoy, composed of two companies of 10th Mt. Division troops along with the remainder of Task Force Ranger, Pakistani tanks and Malaysian armored vehicles, is formed at Mogadishu's New Port, and begins planning the rescue.

23:23 – The rescue convoy moves out, but as it approaches the crash site there is a large explosion which severely damages the convoy and makes the rescue almost impossible. However, a stockpile of rocket-propelled grenades in the city allows them to be used to great effect. A large proportion of the population is affected by power outages due to the Americans' destroying electrical substations in Mogadishu.

October 4, 1993 
At Midnight 00:00 (24:00), the Rangers are still trapped inside Mogadishu without essential equipment, such as night vision devices.

01:55 — Rescue convoy reaches the trapped Ranger force. A second half of the convoy reaches the site of Durant's downed Black Hawk. Durant and his crew are missing.

03:00 — Forces are still struggling to remove the pinned body of Clifton "Elvis" Wolcott, pilot of downed Super Six One.

05:30 — Rangers start moving from the city to the Pakistani Stadium, on foot. Wolcott's body is finally recovered. Vehicles roll out of the city. Elements of the Rangers are left to run to a rendez-vous point on National Street, covering the vehicles whilst enduring gunfire during the exfiltration. The road they take is known as the Mogadishu Mile.

06:30 — The force returns to the Pakistani Stadium. 13 Americans are confirmed dead or mortally wounded, 73 injured, and 6 missing in action (5 are later confirmed dead, raising the death toll to 18, and 1 taken prisoner).

References 

Timelines of military conflicts since 1945
Battle of Mogadishu (1993)
United States military history timelines